Vitaić is a Croatian surname. Notable people with the surname include:

Ante Vitaić (born 1982), Croatian footballer
Frane Vitaić (born 1982), Croatian footballer, brother of Ante

Croatian surnames